Andreas Hårstad (born 11 November 1998 in Oppdal) is a Norwegian curler. He currently skips his own team out of Oppdal.

At the national level, he is a 2019 Norwegian men's champion curler.

Personal life
He started curling in 2008 at the age of 10. As of 2019, he works as a shop assistant. He attended Inland Norway University of Applied Sciences.

Teams

Men's

Mixed

Mixed doubles

References

External links

Hårstad, Andreas S. | Nordic Junior Curling Tour
Video:
 
 

Living people
1998 births
People from Oppdal
Norwegian male curlers
Norwegian curling champions
Curlers at the 2016 Winter Youth Olympics
Competitors at the 2023 Winter World University Games
Sportspeople from Trøndelag
21st-century Norwegian people
Inland Norway University of Applied Sciences alumni